Alexander Drysdale may refer to:

 Mahé Drysdale (Alexander Mahé Owens Drysdale, born 1978), New Zealand rower
 Alexander John Drysdale (1870–1934), artist